Jola (Jola: Joola), also called Jola-Fonyi and Kujamataak, is a language spoken by half a million people in the Casamance region of Senegal, and neighboring countries. Jola-Fonyi is one of several closely related Jola languages spoken in the area.

Phonology

Consonants

Vowels 

Vowel length is also phonemic.

Writing System

In Senegal
In Senegal, the decree  2005-981 created the official orthography of Jola.

Long vowels are indicated by doubling the letter: <aa ee ii oo uu>. The acute accent over a vowel <á é í ó ú> indicates that the advanced and retracted tongue root for that vowel and the other vowels of the words by vowel harmony.

References

Bibliography
 Hopkins, Bradley L. 1995. Contribution à une etude de la syntaxe Diola-Fogny. Cahiers de Recherche Linguistique, 4. Dakar: Société Internationale de Linguistique.
 Hopkins, Bradley and Elizabeth Hopkins. 1992. Apprentissage de la langue Diola-Fogny: Un cours pratique. Dakar: Société Internationale de Linguistique.

See also

 :Category:Diola-language films

External links

 J. David Sapir, Linguistic and Folklore materials from the Kujamaat Jóola.

Languages of Senegal
Jola languages